The men's decathlon event at the 1990 World Junior Championships in Athletics was held in Plovdiv, Bulgaria, at Deveti Septemvri Stadium on 8 and 9 August.  Senior implements (106.7 cm (3'6) hurdles, 7257g shot, 2 kg discus) were used.

Medalists

Results

Final
8/9 August

Participation
According to an unofficial count, 25 athletes from 17 countries participated in the event.

References

Decathlon
Combined events at the World Athletics U20 Championships